The Japanese tit (Parus minor), also known as the Oriental tit, is a passerine bird which replaces the similar great tit in Japan and the Russian Far East beyond the Amur River, including the Kuril Islands.  Until recently, this species was classified as a subspecies of great tit (Parus major), but studies indicated that the two species coexist in the Russian Far East without intermingling or frequent hybridization.

The species made headlines in March 2016, when Toshitaka Suzuki et al. reported in Nature Communications that they had found experimental evidence for compositional syntax in bird calls, marking the first such evidence for that type of syntax in nonhuman animals.  They demonstrated that the Japanese tit will respond to the recruitment call of the willow tit but only as long as it follows the Japanese tit alert call in the correct alert+recruitment order, evidence that  Japanese tits recognize the parts of the combination.

References

External links
Japanese tit  at Avibase

Japanese tit
Birds of East Asia
Birds of Japan
Japanese tit
Japanese tit
Japanese tit